Pericycos guttatus is a species of beetle in the family Cerambycidae. It was described by Heller in 1898, originally under the genus Cycos. It is known from Sulawesi.

References

Lamiini
Beetles described in 1898